Diboké (also spelled Dibohé) is a town in western Ivory Coast. It is a sub-prefecture of Bloléquin Department in Cavally Region, Montagnes District.

Diboké was a commune until March 2012, when it became one of 1126 communes nationwide that were abolished.

In 2014, the population of the sub-prefecture of Diboké was 6,168.

Villages
The 3 villages of the sub-prefecture of Diboké and their population in 2014 are:
 Diboké (4 605)
 Oulai-Taibli (1 038)
 Zilébli (525)

References

Sub-prefectures of Cavally Region
Former communes of Ivory Coast